Oleg Yuriiovych Kosyak (born 26 November 1975 in Kyiv, Ukraine) is a Ukrainian gymnast and sports coach. Merited Master of Sports of Ukraine (1996).

Career
In 1997 he graduated from National University of Physical Education and Sport of Ukraine. Was representing Dynamo Sports Club (Kyiv) in athletic competitions. His coaches are Yuli Kuksenkov, V. Zhovnovatyi. Was training in California Golden Bears teams representing University of California, Berkeley.

At the 1996 Summer Olympics in Atlanta, together with Rustam Sharipov, Olexander Svitlichni, Yuri Yermakov, Vladimir Shamenko, Ihor Korobchynskyi and Hrihoriy Misyutin, Oleg Kosyak won bronze medal in the men's team all-around competition, one of eight events for male competitors in artistic gymnastics. Ukraine team followed Russia and China teams and less than 0.2 points passed ahead of Belarus team.

Besides the sports achievements Oleg Kosyak also received a degree in mathematics from University of California, Berkeley.

Coaching career 

Students of Oleg Kosyak were awarded at regional and California state championships.

References

External links
 Oleg Kosyak profile on Sports Reference

1975 births
Living people
Ukrainian male artistic gymnasts
Olympic bronze medalists for Ukraine
Gymnasts at the 1996 Summer Olympics
Olympic medalists in gymnastics
Medalists at the 1996 Summer Olympics
Gymnasts from Kyiv